Fredrik K.B. is a Norwegian sculptor (born 1978 in Oslo, Norway) living and working nearby Amsterdam, Netherlands. At the age of five, when asked by adults what he wanted to become when he grew up, Fredrik K.B.  answered: 'I already am a sculptor; I just have not started sculpting yet'.
In 2009 Fredrik K.B. was elected "young Artist of the year" by a jury of artists, art consultants and gallerists in Norway. The competition was initiated by Hotel Continental, which has been known for its involvement with art and artists since 1909.

Exhibitions, collections and organisations
Fredrik K.B. has since his debut had many exhibitions in Norway, Denmark, the Netherlands, Italy and France. In October 2010 he had his debut in London, UK, sharing an exhibition with the British painter Michael Aubrey.
Fredrik K.B. has exhibited his sculptures in group exhibitions with Scandinavian masters like Edvard Munch, Kai Fjell, Pushwagner, Frans Widerberg, Nico Widerberg, Kirsten Kokkin, Morten Krogvold and others. His artworks has been bought into numerous collections, amongst others the collection of Hotel Continental in Oslo, which also holds one of the biggest private collections of works by Edvard Munch in Norway. 

Fredrik K.B. is (or was) a member of the Royal British Society of Sculptors, and of the Association of Norwegian Sculptors.

About the art
Fredrik K.B. is most known for his sculptures in granite and marble, but he also makes glass sculptures and graphic art. 
His expression varies between gracious female sculptures and raw, sometimes abstract forms. However, his sculptures always consist human forms. The Danish art-collector and gallery-owner Johnny Emil Larsen has said about the works of Fredrik K.B. that "what connects his work, in all its diversity, is that when one looks at the sculptures, one gets the feeling that he has carved the granite with his own fingernails".
Fredrik K.B. executes all the sculpting himself. The work in glass he does in cooperation with Dutch glass artist Reina Oversteegen.

Realizing the dream
Already as a child Fredrik K.B. dreamed about making sculptures in stone. At the age of five he knew the feeling that there were lines and forms that belonged to him and could express him in the world. At the age of eighteen he decided to go to Italy to learn how to carve marble. 
Before leaving for Italy, Fredrik K.B. spent two years searching for his own lines. These two years he did not touch a stone, he only drew his lines with black pen on white paper. He let go of all ideas about how the result had to be, only focusing on making one perfect line, one perfect form. 
Fredrik K.B. believed that if every line and every form was perfect, the final result would be perfect as well. The word "perfect" in this context meaning completely his.
When Fredrik K.B. came to Carrara, Italy; famous all over the world for its marble, no marble studio would accept him. So Fredrik K.B. bought himself a hammer and some chisels and went up into the marble mountains near Seravezza, where Michelangelo was the first one to take out marble. High in the mountains Fredrik found a stone and started sculpting. After several weeks in the mountains, his first sculpture "Albert" was finished and he managed to carry it down to Pietrasanta, a town said to be a world capital of sculpting. By showing his sculpture, Fredrik K.B. was allowed to work in a marble studio and learn from artists and artisans.

References

External links 
  – The official homepage of Fredrik K.B.
  – Fredrik K.B. weblog from his studio

Norwegian sculptors
1978 births
Living people
Artists from Oslo